DopeNation is a Ghanaian musical duo of identical twin brothers, composed of Micheal Boafo popularly known as B2, and Tony Boafo known as Twist. They are best known for producing hit songs such as Kpuu Kpaa by Shatta wale, Wow by Joey B ft EL, Sebgefia by Joey B and EL, Poison by Ebony Reigns, Forever by Eazzy ft Mr Eazi, Nana Ama by Pappy Kojo, among others and chunning out hits for themselves as Artists.

Early life 
The twins were born in the Accra and grew up in Abeka, a community in Accra. They later moved to Takoradi where they had their junior and senior education, at this period the twins developed their interest in music. They later returned to Accra to further their tertiary education in the University of Ghana and Ghana Technology University College.

Production career 
DopeNation was introduced to music production in 2012 by musician and producer E.L in Accra who nurtured their talents. They have been credited with producing songs for Ghanaian artists including E.L, Shatta Wale, Joey B, Pappy Kojo, Eazzy, Flowking Stone, Olamide, Tekno, Fameye among others.

In 2021, they discovered and introduced visually impaired singer, Adelaide The Seer, to the music scene as her official producers, going on to release the singles, “Wire Me” and “What a God“ among others.

Music career 
DopeNation released their first single, “Bebia Ye Shi” in 2016, released “Uh Huh” in 2017 as a follow up. On 2 April 2018, they released the highly acclaimed self-produced single, “Eish”

"Naami", which was their next song, had Nigerian musician Olamide and disc jockey DJ Enimoney, winning them Sound City MVP Group of the year in Africa award. In 2021, a collaborative E.P titled “Music and Dance” with Ghanaian dance duo, Dancegod Llyod and Afrobeast of DWP Academy was released.

DopeNation was nominated for Music Producer Honor of the Year at the 2017 Ghana Music Honors Awards

Discography

Albums & EPs 

 Atta Album - 2021

Production discography

Videography

Awards and nominations

Ghana Music Awards

Ghana Music Awards UK

Ghana Tertiary Awards

Ghana Music Honours

SoundCity MVP Awards

Global Music Awards

Africa Business & Art Awards Europe

3Music Awards

Western Music Awards

Fame Awards

References 

Ghanaian musicians
Living people
People from Western Region (Ghana)
1993 births
Identical twin males
Musical groups established in 2016
Twin musical duos
Ghanaian rappers
Ghanaian record producers
Male musical duos
2016 establishments in Ghana